Football at the 2013 Islamic Solidarity Games was held in Indonesia from 19 to 29 September 2013.

Teams
The tournament was for U23 teams. Morocco and Turkey participated with U20 teams.

Venues

Squads

For the men's tournament, each nation submitted a squad of 23 players, 20 of whom had to be born on or after 1 January 1990, and three of whom could be overage players. A minimum of two goalkeepers (plus one optional alternate goalkeeper) had to be included in the squad.

Group stage

Group A

Group B

Knockout stage

Semi-finals

Bronze medal match

Gold medal match

Medalists

Final ranking

Statistics

Goalscorers

References

External links
  Programme & résultats (PDF)
Official website
2013 South Sumatera

 
2013
football
2013
2013 in Indonesian football
2013–14 in Saudi Arabian football
2013–14 in Syrian football
2013–14 in Palestinian football
2013–14 in Turkish football
2013–14 in Iraqi football
2013–14 in Moroccan football